Mitogen-activated protein kinase kinase kinase 19 is a protein that in humans is encoded by the MAP3K19 gene.

References

Sources